Stigler's law of eponymy, proposed by University of Chicago statistics professor Stephen Stigler in his 1980 publication Stigler’s law of eponymy, states that no scientific discovery is named after its original discoverer. Examples include Hubble's law, which was derived by Georges Lemaître two years before Edwin Hubble; the Pythagorean theorem, which was known to Babylonian mathematicians before Pythagoras; and Halley's Comet, which was observed by astronomers since at least 240 BC (although its official designation is due to the first ever mathematical prediction of such astronomical phenomenon in the sky, not to its discovery). Stigler himself named the sociologist Robert K. Merton as the discoverer of "Stigler's law" to show that it follows its own decree, though the phenomenon had previously been noted by others.

Derivation
Historical acclaim for discoveries is often assigned to persons of note who bring attention to an idea that is not yet widely known, whether or not that person was its original inventor – theories may be named long after their discovery. In the case of eponymy, the idea becomes named after that person, even if that person is acknowledged by historians of science not to be the one who discovered it. Often, several people will arrive at a new idea around the same time, as in the case of calculus. It can be dependent on the publicity of the new work and the fame of its publisher as to whether the scientist's name becomes historically associated.

Similar concepts
There is a similar quote attributed to Mark Twain:It takes a thousand men to invent a telegraph, or a steam engine, or a phonograph, or a photograph, or a telephone or any other important thing – and the last man gets the credit and we forget the others. He added his little mite – that is all he did. These object lessons should teach us that ninety-nine parts of all things that proceed from the intellect are plagiarisms, pure and simple; and the lesson ought to make us modest. But nothing can do that.

Stephen Stigler's father, the economist George Stigler, also examined the process of discovery in economics. He said, "If an earlier, valid statement of a theory falls on deaf ears, and a later restatement is accepted by the science, this is surely proof that the science accepts ideas only when they fit into the then-current state of the science." He gave several examples in which the original discoverer was not recognized as such.

The Matthew effect was coined by Robert K. Merton to describe how eminent scientists get more credit than a comparatively unknown researcher, even if their work is similar, so that credit will usually be given to researchers who are already famous. Merton notes: 
The effect applies specifically to women through the Matilda effect.

Boyer's law was named by Hubert Kennedy in 1972. It says, "Mathematical formulas and theorems are usually not named after their original discoverers" and was named after Carl Boyer, whose book A History of Mathematics contains many examples of this law. Kennedy observed that "it is perhaps interesting to note that this is probably a rare instance of a law whose statement confirms its own validity".

"Everything of importance has been said before by somebody who did not discover it" is an adage attributed to Alfred North Whitehead.

List of examples

See also
 List of misnamed theorems
 List of persons considered father or mother of a scientific field
 Eponym
 Scientific priority
 Matthew effect
 Matilda effect
 Obliteration by incorporation
 Theories and sociology of the history of science
 Standing on the shoulders of giants

References

Further reading
 
  (Festschrift for Robert K. Merton)

External links
  on 
  Stigler's law is described near the end of the article

Sociology of scientific knowledge
Scientific method
Eponyms